Stenoma sematopa is a moth of the family Depressariidae. It is found in Guyana.

The wingspan is 15–16 mm. The forewings are light glossy grey, with a faint violet tinge and with the extreme costal edge whitish. There are short very fine ochreous-whitish lines from the base in the middle and on the fold. The hindwings are grey.

References

Moths described in 1915
Taxa named by Edward Meyrick
Stenoma